Raffaelea is a genus of ambrosia fungi in the family Ophiostomataceae. It was circumscribed by mycologists Josef Adolph von Arx and Grégoire L. Hennebert in 1965 with Raffaelea ambrosiae as the type species. The genus is named in honor of Italian botanist Raffaele Ciferri. 

Laurel wilt is a disease of redbay (Persea borbonia) caused by Raffaelea lauricola. This fungus, harbored in the mycangium of the redbay ambrosia beetle Xyleborus glabratus, is in the form of a budding yeast in the mycangium and a filamentous fungus in galleries of the beetle. Several species also resident in the beetle were described as new to science in 2010: R. ellipticospora, R. fusca, R. subalba, and R. subfusca.

Species

Raffaelea albimanens
Raffaelea ambrosiae
Raffaelea arxii
Raffaelea barbata
Raffaelea canadensis
Raffaelea ellipticospora
Raffaelea fusca
Raffaelea hennebertii
Raffaelea lauricola
Raffaelea montetyi
Raffaelea quercivora
Raffaelea quercus-mongolicae
Raffaelea santoroi
Raffaelea scolytodis
Raffaelea subalba
Raffaelea subfusca
Raffaelea sulcati
Raffaelea tritirachium
Raffaelea variabilis

References

External links

Sordariomycetes genera
Ophiostomatales